King Haakon VII Sea is a proposed name for part of the Southern Ocean on the coast of East Antarctica.

Geography
The International Hydrographic Organization (IHO), often recognized as the authority for worldwide water body names, does not include this sea name.   The IHO 2002 draft was never approved by the IHO (or any other organization), and the 1953 IHO document (which does not contain the name) remains currently in force.   Most leading geographic authorities and atlases do not use the name, including the 2014 10th edition World Atlas from the National Geographic Society.

By a narrow proposed definition, this sea would be between the Weddell Sea and a proposed Lazarev Sea name, and thus stretch only along Princess Martha Coast from Cape Norvegia at 12°18′W, the easternmost point of the Weddell Sea, to Fimbul Ice Shelf close to the Prime Meridian at 0°0′, which is proposed as the western border of Lazarev Sea.

The water here is covered by ice most of the year. During autumn pack ice forms which does not break up until spring. The rough coordinates of the proposed sea area would be .

The area is an important habitat for the Ross seal (Ommatophoca rossii).

History
On 27 January 1820 Russian Fabian Gottlieb von Bellingshausen made the first confirmed sighting of Terra Australis (Antarctica) as he was cruising this area near the Fimbul Ice Shelf at Princess Märtha Coast.

The area is named in honour of Haakon VII, the first king of Norway after the dissolution from Sweden.

Further reading 
 Beau Riffenburgh, Encyclopedia of the Antarctic, Volume 1, P 816

References

External links
 Picture from the King Haakon VII Sea
 Overview map of the area from NASA

Seas of the Southern Ocean
East Antarctica